There are two places in County Durham called Shotton:

 Shotton, near Peterlee
 Shotton, near Sedgefield